or  is the highest mountain in the Saltfjellet mountain range in Nordland county, Norway. It is located in the municipality of Saltdal roughly halfway between the lakes Nordre Bjøllåvatnet and Kjemåvatnet.

The mountain has two peaks, the highest being .

Name
The first element is øl which means "haze" (not "beer"), and the last element is the finite form of fjell which means "mountain".

References

Saltdal
Mountains of Nordland